This is the electoral history of John Dingell, a former Democratic Representative from Detroit who represented the 15th and 16th districts. Dingell was first elected in a 1955 special election to replace his late father, and was re-elected in every subsequent election until his retirement in 2014. He was the longest serving member of the United States House of Representatives, and the United States Congress overall.

|+ : Results 1956–1962
! Year
!
! Democrat
! Votes
! %
!
! Republican
! Votes
! %
!
! Third Party
! Party
! Votes
! %
!
! Third Party
! Party
! Votes
! %
!
|-
|1956
||
| |John Dingell
| |111,827
| |77%
|
| |Larry Middleton
| |33,973
| |23%
|
| |Roxann Higgs
| |Prohibition
| |206
| |0%
|
|
|
|
|
|
|-
|1958
||
| |John Dingell
| |79,216
| |78%
|
| |Austin Curtis
| |21,414
| |21%
|
|! style="background:#DD051D; "|Charles Aranoff
|! style="background:#DD051D; "|Socialist Labor
|! style="background:#DD051D; "|199
|! style="background:#DD051D; "|0%
|
| |Estelle Tripp
| |Prohibition
| |98
| |0%
|
|-
|1960
||
| |John Dingell
| |111,671
| |79%
|
| |Robert Robbins
| |28,532
| |20%
|
| |Hiram Coffman
| |Prohibition
| |207
| |0%
|
|! style="background:#DD051D; "|Joseph Koss
|! style="background:#DD051D; "|Socialist Labor
|! style="background:#DD051D; "|114
|! style="background:#DD051D; "|0%
|
|-
|1962
||
| |John Dingell
| |94,197
| |83%
|
| |Ernest Richard
| |19,258
| |17%
|
|
|
|
|
|
|

|+ : Results 1964–2000
! Year
!
! Democrat
! Votes
! %
!
! Republican
! Votes
! %
!
! Third Party
! Party
! Votes
! %
!
! Third Party
! Party
! Votes
! %
!
! Third Party
! Party
! Votes
! %
|-
|1964
||
| |John Dingell
| |112,763
| |73%
|
| |Monte Bona
| |40,673
| |26%
|
|! style="background:#aa0000; "|Henry Austin
|! style="background:#aa0000; "|Socialist Workers
|! style="background:#aa0000; "|189
|! style="background:#aa0000; "|0%
|
|
|
|
|
|
|
|
|
|
|-
|1966
||
| |John Dingell
| |71,787
| |63%
|
| |John Dempsey
| |42,738
| |37%
|
|
|
|
|
|
|
|
|
|
|
|
|
|
|
|-
|1968
||
| |John Dingell
| |105,690
| |74%
|
| |Monte Bona
| |37,000
| |26%
|
|! style="background:#aa0000; "|Henry Austin
|! style="background:#aa0000; "|Socialist Workers
|! style="background:#aa0000; "|369
|! style="background:#aa0000; "|0%
|
|
|
|
|
|
|
|
|
|
|-
|1970
||
| |John Dingell
| |90,540
| |79%
|
| |William Rostrom
| |23,867
| |21%
|
|
|
|
|
|
|
|
|
|
|
|
|
|
|
|-
|1972
||
| |John Dingell
| |110,715
| |68%
|
| |William Rostrom
| |48,414
| |30%
|
| |Peter Gayner
| |American Independent
| |3,554
| |2%
|
|
|
|
|
|
|
|
|
|
|-
|1974
||
| |John Dingell
| |95,834
| |78%
|
| |Wallace English
| |25,248
| |20%
|
| |Virginia Crawford
| |American Independent
| align="right" |1,605
| align="right" |1%
|
|! style="background:#aa0000; "|Donald Bechler
|! style="background:#aa0000; "|Socialist Workers
|! style="background:#aa0000; " align="right"|365
|! style="background:#aa0000; " align="right"|0%
|
||Lewis Steinhardt
||U.S. Labor
||232
||0%
|-
|1976
||
| |John Dingell
| |121,682
| |76%
|
| |William Rostron
| |36,378
| |23%
|
| |Buck Slayter
| |American Independent
| align="right" |1,009
| align="right" |1%
|
| |Samuel Hancock
| |Libertarian
| align="right" |484 
| align="right" |0%
|
||Susan Dalto
||U.S. Labor
||463
||0%
|-
|1978
||
| |John Dingell
| |93,387
| |70%
|
| |Melvin Heuer
| |26,827
| |22%
|
| |Harry Hengy
| |American Independent
| |1,889
| |2%
|
|
|
|
|
|
|
|
|
|
|-
|1980
||
| |John Dingell
| |105,844
| |70%
|
| |Pamella Seay
| |42,735
| |28%
|
| |R. Scott Davidson
| |Libertarian
| |1,810
| |1%
|
| |Ronald Slote
| |American Independent
| |1,069
| |1%
|
|
|
|
|
|-
|1982
||
| |John Dingell
| |114,006
| |74%
|
| |David Haskins
| |39,227
| |25%
|
|! style="background:#aa0000; "|Susan Apstein
|! style="background:#aa0000; "|Socialist Workers
|! style="background:#aa0000; "|1,071
|! style="background:#aa0000; "|1%
|
|! style="background:#FF3300; "|Paul Scherrer
|! style="background:#FF3300; "|Workers League
|! style="background:#FF3300; "|450
|! style="background:#FF3300; "|0%
|
|
|
|
|
|-
|1984
||
| |John Dingell
| |121,463
| |64%
|
| |Frank Grzywacki
| |68,116
| |36%
|
| |Donald Kostyu
| |Libertarian
| |1,042
| |1%
|
|
|
|
|
|
|
|
|
|
|-
|1986
||
| |John Dingell
| |101,659
| |78%
|
| |Frank Grzywacki
| |28,971
| |22%
|
|
|
|
|
|
|
|
|
|
|
|
|
|
|
|-
|1988
||
| |John Dingell
| |132,775
| |97%
|
| |No candidate
| |
| |
|
|! style="background:#FF7796 "|Russell Leone
|! style="background:#FF7796 "|Workers Against Concessions
|! style="background:#FF7796 "|3,561
|! style="background:#FF7796 "|3%
|
|
|
|
|
|
|
|
|
|
|-
|1990
||
| |John Dingell
| |88,962
| |67%
|
| |William Morse
| |42,469
| |32%
|
| |Roger Pope
| |Libertarian
| |2,019
| |2%
|
|
|
|
|
|
|
|
|
|
|-
|1992
||
| |John Dingell
| |156,964
| |65%
|
| |	Frank Beaumont
| |75,694
| |31%
|
| |Max Siegle
| |Tisch Independent Citizens
| align="right" |4,048
| align="right" |2%
|
| |Jeff Hampton
| |Libertarian
| align="right" |1,842 
| align="right" |1%
|
|! style="background:#FF3300 "|Martin McLaughlin
|! style="background:#FF3300 "|Workers League
|! style="background:#FF3300 "|1,842 
|! style="background:#FF3300 "|1%
|-
|1994
||
| |John Dingell
| |105,846
| |59%
|
| |Ken Larkin
| |71,159
| |40%
|
|! style="background:#00bfff; "|Noha Hamze
|! style="background:#00bfff; "|Natural Law
|! style="background:#00bfff; "|1,968
|! style="background:#00bfff; "|1%
|
|
|
|
|
|
|
|
|
|
|-
|1996
||
| |John Dingell
| |136,854
| |62%
|
| |James Desana
| |78,723
| |36%
|
| |Bruce Cain
| |Libertarian
| |3,155
| |1%
|
|! style="background:#00bfff; "|Noha Hamze
|! style="background:#00bfff; "|Natural Law
|! style="background:#00bfff; "|1,018
|! style="background:#00bfff; "|0%
|
|! style="background:#FF3300 "|David Sole
|! style="background:#FF3300 "|Workers World
|! style="background:#FF3300 "|842
|! style="background:#FF3300 "|0%
|-
|1998
||
| |John Dingell
| |116,145
| |67%
|
| |William Morse
| |54,121
| |31%
|
| |Edward Hlavac
| |Libertarian
| |3,064
| |2%
|
|! style="background:#00bfff; "|Noha Hamze
|! style="background:#00bfff; "|Natural Law
|! style="background:#00bfff; "|1,027
|! style="background:#00bfff; "|1%
|
|
|
|
|
|-
|2000
||
| |John Dingell
| |167,142
| |71%
|
| |William Morse
| |62,469
| |27%
|
| |Edward Hlavac
| |Libertarian
| |2,814
| |1%
|
| |Ken Larkin
| |U.S. Taxpayers
| |2,154
| |1%
|
|! style="background:#00bfff; "|Noha Hamze
|! style="background:#00bfff; "|Natural Law
|! style="background:#00bfff; "|938
|! style="background:#00bfff; "|0%

|+ : Results 2002–2010
! Year
!
! Democrat
! Votes
! %
!
! Republican
! Votes
! %
!
! Third Party
! Party
! Votes
! %
!
! Third Party
! Party
! Votes
! %
!
! Third Party
! Party
! Votes
! %
|-
|2002
||
| |John Dingell
| |136,518
| |72%
|
| |	Martin Kaltenbach
| |48,626
| |26%
|
| |Gregory Stempfle
| |Libertarian
| align="right" |3,919
| align="right" |2%
|
|
|
|
|
|
|
|
|
|
|-
|2004
||
| |John Dingell
| |218,409
| |71%
|
| |Dawn Reamer
| |81,828
| |27%
|
| |Gregory Stempfle
| |Libertarian
| |3,400
| |1%
|
| |Mike Eller
| |U.S. Taxpayers
| |2,508
| |1%
|
| |Jerome White
| |NPA
| align="right" |1,818
| align="right" |1%
|-
|2006
||
| |John Dingell
| |181,946
| |88%
|
| |No candidate
| |
| |
|
| |Aimee Smith
| |Green
| |9,447
| |5%
|
| |Gregory Stempfle
| |Libertarian
| |8,410
| |4%
|
| |Robert Czak
| |U.S. Taxpayers
| |7,064
| |3%
|-
|2008
||
| |John Dingell
| |231,784
| |71%
|
| |John Lynch
| |81,802
| |25%
|
| |Aimee Smith
| |Green
| |7,082
| |2%
|
| |Gregory Stempfle
| |Libertarian
| |4,002
| |1%
|
| |James Wagner
| |U.S. Taxpayers
| |3,157
| |1%
|-
|2010
||
| |John Dingell
| |116,293
| |57%
|
| |Rob Steele
| |71,108
| |40%
|
| |Aimee Smith
| |Green
| |2,686
| |1%
|
| |Kerry Morgan
| |Libertarian
| |1,969
| |1%
|
| |Matthew Furman
| |U.S. Taxpayers
| |1,821
| |1%

|+ : 2012 Results
! Year
!
! Democrat
! Votes
! %
!
! Republican
! Votes
! %
!
! Third Party
! Party
! Votes
! %
!
|-
|2012
||
| |John Dingell
| |216,884
| |68%
|
| |Cynthia Kallgren
| |92,472
| |29%
|
| |Richard Secula
| |Libertarian
| |9,867
| |3%
|

References

Dingell, John